Daniel Jurafsky is a professor of linguistics and computer science at Stanford University, and also an author. With Daniel Gildea, he is known for developing the first automatic system for semantic role labeling (SRL). He is the author of The Language of Food: A Linguist Reads the Menu (2014) and a textbook on speech and language processing (2000). Jurafsky was given a MacArthur Fellowship in 2002.

Education 
Jurafsky received his B.A in linguistics (1983) and Ph.D. in computer science (1992), both at University of California, Berkeley; and then a postdoc at International Computer Science Institute, Berkeley (1992–1995).

Academic life
He is the author of The Language of Food: A Linguist Reads the Menu (W. W. Norton & Company, 2014). With James H. Martin, he wrote the textbook Speech and Language Processing: An Introduction to Natural Language Processing, Computational Linguistics, and Speech Recognition (Prentice Hall, 2000).

The first automatic system for semantic role labeling (SRL, sometimes also referred to as "shallow semantic parsing") was developed by Daniel Gildea and Daniel Jurafsky to automate the FrameNet annotation process in 2002; SRL has since become one of the standard tasks in natural language processing.

Personal life
Jurafsky resides in San Francisco, California.

Selected works
 2009. Speech and Language Processing: An Introduction to Natural Language Processing, Computational Linguistics, and Speech Recognition, 2nd Edition. (with James H. Martin) Prentice-Hall. 
 2014. The Language of Food: A Linguist Reads the Menu. W. W. Norton & Company.

Honors and awards
 1998. NSF Career Award
 2002. MacArthur Fellowship
 2019. LSA Fellow
 2022 Atkinson Prizes in Psychological and Cognitive Sciences

References

External links
 Dan Jurafsky's Home Page at Stanford University
 Bibliography of works by Dan Jurafsky

Living people
American non-fiction writers
MacArthur Fellows
Stanford University Department of Linguistics faculty
Stanford University School of Engineering faculty
1962 births
Natural language processing researchers
Computational linguistics researchers
Linguists from the United States
Fellows of the Linguistic Society of America